Johann Oswald Harms (baptised 30 April 1643 in Hamburg – 1708 in Braunschweig) was a German Baroque painter, engraver, and the first notable stage set designer of the Baroque. He worked for the Opernhaus am Taschenberg in Dresden, painting the ceiling and designing stage sets.

Selected works 

 Collection of etchings of Roman ruins (Alcune invenzione di Rovine et Architetture disegnate e fatte con aqua forte da G.O.H), 1673
 Ceiling frescoes in Schloss Brüggen
 Painting of the hall of the Hauptkirche St. Jacobi in Hamburg

The Herzog Anton Ulrich Museum in Braunschweig houses his legacy of etchings and stage set designs.

Literature 
 Norman-Mathias Pingel: Harms, Johann Oswald. In: Braunschweiger Stadtlexikon. ed. Luitgard Camerer, Manfred R. W. Garzmann and Wolf-Dieter Schuegraf. Braunschweig 1996, p. 61. 
 Horst-Rüdiger Jarck, Günter Scheel (ed.): Braunschweigisches Biographisches Lexikon. 19. und 20. Jahrhundert. Hannover 1996, pp. 301–302. 
 Horst-Rüdiger Jarck, Gerhard Schildt (ed.): Braunschweigische Landesgeschichte. Jahrtausendrückblick einer Region. Braunschweig 2000, pp. 640–642.

External links 

 

German Baroque painters
German engravers
German scenic designers
1643 births
1708 deaths